The Japanese Association of Management Accounting (JAMA, 日本管理会計学会) was founded in 1991 and has devoted to promote studies and practices of management accounting.

About JAMA 
JAMA  was preceded by the Association of Quantitative Accounting founded by Dr. Yoichi Kata-oka, JAMA, is a academic organization of management accounting researchers, educators, and professional. Currently, JAMA has approximately 800 members.

Objectives
JAMA provides a variety of services to its members and the profession, including:
Annual meetings
Forums 
Research seminars 
Journals, e.g. The Journal of Management Accounting (管理会計学) ISSN 0918-7863
Accounting books and monographs

References

External links 
JAMA The Japanese Association of Management Accounting (日本管理会計学会)
Dr. Yoichi Kata-oka, 

Accounting organizations